The 2022 Guamanian gubernatorial election took place on November 8, 2022, to elect the governor of Guam. Incumbent Democratic Governor Lou Leon Guerrero, who was elected in 2018 with 50.7% of the vote, sought a second term. She faced former Republican governor Felix Camacho.

Guerrero defeated Camacho in the general election, winning a second term as governor. Guerrero was the first Democratic Governor of Guam elected to a second term in office since Carl Gutierrez in 1998.

Democratic primary

Candidates

Nominee
 Lou Leon Guerrero, incumbent Governor
 Josh Tenorio, incumbent Lieutenant Governor

Eliminated in Primary
 Michael San Nicolas, incumbent Delegate to the U.S. House of Representitves
 Sabrina Salas Matanane, KUAM managing director for local productions

Results

Republican primary

Candidates

Nominee
 Felix Camacho, former Governor (2003–2011)
 Vicente "Tony" Ada, state senator

Declined
 James "Jim" Moylan, former Guam Senate Minority Leader (running for delegate)

Results

General election

Results

References

Gubernatorial
Guam
Guam